Pusula is a genus of small sea snails, marine gastropod mollusks in the family Triviidae, the false cowries or trivias.

Species
Species within the genus Pusula include:
 † Pusula alienigena Schilder, 1928 
 Pusula bessei Petuch, 2013
 Pusula cimex (Sowerby, 1870) 
 Pusula costipunctata (Sowerby, 1870)
 † Pusula dadeensis Petuch, 1994 
 † Pusula dalli (Petuch, 1994) 
 † Pusula densistans Fehse & Grego, 2014
 Pusula elsiae (Howard & Sphon, 1960) (nomen dubium)
 Pusula garciai Fehse & Grego, 2014
 † Pusula guppyi Schilder, 1939 
 Pusula hybrida (Schilder, 1931)
 Pusula labiosa (Gaskoin, 1836)
 Pusula lindajoyceae Petuch, 1994
 † Pusula miamiensis Petuch, 1991 
 † Pusula orientalis Schilder, 1939 
 Pusula pediculus (Linnaeus, 1758)
 † Pusula permagna (Johnson, 1910) 
 † Pusula platyventer Fehse & Grego, 2014 
 Pusula pullata (Sowerby, 1870)
 Pusula radians (Lamarck, 1810)
 Pusula solandri (Sowerby, 1832)
 † Pusula subpediculus (Sacco, 1894)
Species brought into synonymy
 † Pusula andersoni Petuch & Drohlshagen, 2011: synonym of † Pusula lindajoyceae Petuch, 1994 
 Pusula bermontiana (Petuch, 1994): synonym of Pusula pediculus (Linnaeus, 1758)
 Pusula californiana (Gray, 1827): synonym of Pseudopusula californiana (Gray, 1827)
 Pusula californica (Sowerby, 1832): synonym of Pseudopusula californiana (Gray, 1827)
 Pusula calusa Petuch & Drolshagen, 2011: synonym of † Pusula dalli (Petuch, 1994) 
 Pusula campus Cate, 1979: synonym of Niveria campus (Cate, 1979)
 Pusula candidula (Gaskoin, 1835): synonym of Trivia candidula (Gaskoin, 1836)
 Pusula carabus Cate, 1979: synonym of Niveria carabus (Cate, 1979)
 Pusula cherobia Cate, 1979: synonym of Niveria cherobia (Cate, 1979)
 Pusula crovoae Olsson, 1967: synonym of † Pusula orientalis Schilder, 1939
 Pusula depauperata (Sowerby, 1832): synonym of Pseudopusula depauperata (Sowerby, 1832)
 Pusula janae Lorenz, 2001: synonym of Dolichupis janae (Lorenz, 2001)
 Pusula juyingae Petuch & Sargent, 2011: synonym of Pusula labiosa (Gaskoin, 1836)
 Pusula leucosphaera Schilder, 1931: synonym of Dolichupis leucosphaera (Schilder, 1931)
 Pusula loochooensis Cate, 1979: synonym of Pseudopusula californiana (Gray, 1827)
 Pusula macaeica Fehse & Grego, 2005: synonym of Niveria macaeica (Fehse & Grego, 2005)
 Pusula maltbiana (Schwengel & McGinty, 1942): synonym of Niveria maltbiana (Schwengel & McGinty, 1942)
 Pusula olssoni Petuch & Drolshagen, 2011 †: synonym of † Pusula orientalis Schilder, 1939
 Pusula pacei (Petuch, 1987): synonym of Pusula cimex (Sowerby, 1870)
 Pusula padreserrai Cate, 1979: synonym of Pusula solandri (Sowerby, 1832)
 Pusula pygmaea Schilder, 1931: synonym of Cleotrivia pygmaea (Schilder, 1931)
 Pusula rubinicolor (Gaskoin, 1836): synonym of Dolichupis rubinicolor (Gaskoin, 1836)

References

 Vaught, K.C. (1989). A classification of the living Mollusca. American Malacologists: Melbourne, FL (USA). . XII, 195 pp.
 Fehse D. (2002) "Beiträge zur Kenntnis der Triviidae (Mollusca: Gastropoda) V. Kritische Beurteilung der Genera und Beschreibung einer neuen Art der Gattung Semitrivia Cossmann, 1903". Acta Conchyliorum 6: 3-48. page(s): 10
 Rolán E., 2005. Malacological Fauna From The Cape Verde Archipelago. Part 1, Polyplacophora and Gastropoda

External links

Triviidae